Lost in Yonkers is a 1993 American film adaptation of Neil Simon's 1991 Pulitzer Prize-winning play of the same name, directed by Martha Coolidge. It stars Irene Worth, Mercedes Ruehl, and Richard Dreyfuss. It was the first theatrical feature film to be edited on Avid Media Composer.

Plot
In 1942, following the death of their mother, 15-year-old Jay Kurnitz and his 13-year-old brother Arty move from the Bronx to Yonkers to live temporarily with their strict, stern Grandma Kurnitz and her daughter Aunt Bella, so that their father Eddie can take a traveling sales job and pay off his late wife's medical debt. Grandma's harsh upbringing of her own children has estranged all of them but Bella, who has the mind and emotions of a child despite being in her late 30s. Grandma, whom Eddie has avoided visiting and who did not get along with his now-deceased wife, at first refuses to take in the boys, but Bella is happy to see them and uncharacteristically stands up to Grandma, threatening to move out into "the home" for those with mental conditions and leave Grandma all alone if she doesn't let the boys stay.

Jay and Arty do not enjoy living under Grandma's strict rules. Upon learning from Bella that Grandma has hidden $15,000 somewhere in the house and attached candy store, the boys try to find it so they can pay off their father's debt and he can return home. Meanwhile, the boys' Uncle Louie, a mobster, returns to his mother's house to hide from another mobster, Hollywood Harry, who is stalking him hoping to get what Louie has in a black bag. Louie responded to Grandma's harsh upbringing by becoming tough and independent, and starting a life of thievery and crime at a young age. Louie encourages the boys to have similar "moxie", but also reveals to them that Grandma herself was traumatized at age 12, when she saw police kill her father and was herself permanently disabled in the ensuing riot. As a result, Grandma believes people must be "like steel" in order to simply survive.

Bella has fallen in love with Johnny, the head usher at the local movie house, who like her is mentally slow and lives with his parents. Bella and Johnny plan to get married and open their own restaurant, for which they need $5000, which Bella hopes to convince Grandma to give her. After agonizing about how to discuss this with Grandma, Bella announces it at a family dinner attended by Louie and their sister Gert, whose fear of Grandma caused her to develop a speech impediment. Grandma disapproves of the match, causing Bella to break down crying and leave the house, moving in with Gert. That night, Jay helps Louie steal Hollywood Harry's car and escape with the black bag. Louie later calls Bella to tell her he's now the "richest guy in Guadalcanal."

Bella now has $5000 (later revealed to have been given to her by Louie) but discovers that Johnny is too afraid to marry her or open a restaurant. She returns to Grandma's house where they have an emotional confrontation. Grandma's stern harshness is shown to be her reaction to not only her own childhood trauma, but also grief from the deaths of her husband and two of her children at young ages. Bella agrees to move back in with Grandma on the condition that Bella will lead a more independent life. Eddie returns from his business travels and reclaims his sons, who leave Grandma a loving farewell card. In the final scene of the film (which implies, but does not explicitly show, Grandma's death), Bella leaves Yonkers for good and sends Eddie and the boys a postcard from Florida, where she has gotten a restaurant job.

Cast
 Richard Dreyfuss as Louie
 Mercedes Ruehl as Bella
 Irene Worth as Grandma
 Mike Damus as Arty
 Brad Stoll as Jay
 David Strathairn as Johnny
 Robert Guy Miranda as Hollywood Harry
 Jack Laufer as Eddie 
 Susan Merson as Gert
 Illya Haase as Harry's Crony

Broadway play

After eleven previews, the Broadway production, directed by Gene Saks, opened on February 21, 1991, at the Richard Rodgers Theatre, where it ran for 780 performances. The original cast included Jamie Marsh,  Irene Worth, Mercedes Ruehl, and Kevin Spacey.

Reception
The film holds a score of 71% on Rotten Tomatoes, based on 17 reviews. Audiences surveyed by CinemaScore gave the film a grade of "B+" on scale of A+ to F.

Roger Ebert gave the film three stars out of four and wrote, "All of the performances are good, but one of them, by Mercedes Ruehl, casts a glow over the entire film." Gene Siskel of the Chicago Tribune awarded two-and-a-half stars out of four and wrote, "A wonderful play about a classically unhappy household that has been turned into a typical, mechanical Neil Simon joke machine. Simon's stage words rarely transfer well to the more realistic arena of film, and this is no exception. Another liability is that Richard Dreyfuss hams his way through a role that was played with dignity and poignancy on stage by Kevin Spacey." Janet Maslin of The New York Times described the film as "sometimes more picturesque than powerful. But it conveys all the warmth and color of the original material." Todd McCarthy of Variety wrote "Story of a domineering old woman's tyranny over two generations of offspring is adroitly structured and contains strong human elements, but what proved so affecting onstage seems a bit pat and calculated when viewed in closeup." Peter Rainer of the Los Angeles Times described the film as "essentially deep-dish Neil Simon, which is, after all, not so very deep. But neither is the play negligible; it has a felt, melancholy undertow, and Ruehl and Worth, who both won Tonys for their performances on Broadway, bring out its full, racking sadness." Peter Travers of Rolling Stone wrote "In the film version, with Ruehl and Worth repeating their Tony-winning roles, Simon intensifies the barrage of belly laughs and bathos. Director Martha Coolidge, whose Rambling Rose was a model of graceful literary adaptation, seems at a loss with the crass material."

References

External links
 
 
 
 
 

1993 films
American coming-of-age comedy-drama films
Columbia Pictures films
Films scored by Elmer Bernstein
Films set in Westchester County, New York
Films set in the Bronx
Films set in the 1940s
American films based on plays
Films directed by Martha Coolidge
Films with screenplays by Neil Simon
Films based on works by Neil Simon
1990s coming-of-age comedy-drama films
1993 comedy films
1993 drama films
1990s English-language films
1990s American films